The Pataudi Trophy is awarded to the winner of each Test cricket series between England and India contested in England. The trophy itself was designed and made by Jocelyn Burton. It was first awarded in 2007 to commemorate the 75 years since the first Test match between the two sides. India won the first Pataudi Trophy in England in 2007.

Series are played in accordance with the International Cricket Council's future tours programme, with varying lengths of time between tours. If a series is drawn then the country holding the Pataudi Trophy retains it.

Background
The trophy is named after the Pataudi cricketing family. Iftikhar Ali Khan Pataudi played for both international teams on three occasions and is the only man to have played for England and India. Iftikhar's son Mansoor Ali Khan Pataudi was a long-term captain of the Indian side in the 1960s and 1970s. The Pataudi Trophy is presented to the victorious team as a symbol of its victory.

In India, the England-India Test series is played for the Anthony De Mello Trophy, albeit there have been attempts to make the Pataudi Trophy the winner's prize in India, as well as England.

Prior to the trophy's inception, India played in England for fourteen series. The overall record was 11 English victories, 2 Indian victories, and 1 drawn series.

Trophy
In 2007, Marylebone Cricket Club commissioned a new trophy to celebrate the 75th anniversary of India's first Test match in 1932. The trophy was designed and made by London Silversmith Jocelyn Burton in her studio in Holborn. The Trophy was displayed at Jocelyn's exhibition in November and December 2012 at Bentley & Skinner, London.

Results
A team must win a series to hold the Pataudi Trophy. A drawn series results in the previous holders retaining the trophy. Five complete Pataudi Trophy series have been played, with India winning one, England three, and one drawn.

The grounds used have been Lord's (2007, 2011, 2014, 2018 and 2021), Edgbaston (2011, 2018 and 2022), The Oval (2007, 2011, 2014, 2018 and 2021), Trent Bridge (2007, 2011, 2014, 2018 and 2021), Old Trafford (2014), the Rose Bowl (2014 and 2018) and Headingley (2021).

See also
Laws of cricket
Cricket terminology
Border-Gavaskar Trophy
Anthony de Mello Trophy
Freedom Trophy (cricket)

Notes

References

Cricket awards and rankings
Cricket rivalries
England in international cricket
India in international cricket
Test cricket competitions